The 15th Infantry Division (15-ya Pekhotnaya Diviziya) was an infantry formation of the Russian Imperial Army that existed in various formations from the early 19th century until the end of World War I and the Russian Revolution. The division was based in Odessa in the years leading up to 1914. It fought in World War I and was demobilized in 1918.

Organization 
The 15th Infantry Division was part of the 8th Army Corps. Its order of battle in 1914 was as follows:
1st Brigade (HQ Mykolaiv)
57th Modlin Infantry Regiment 
58th Prague Infantry Regiment
2nd Brigade (HQ Odessa)
59th Lublin Infantry Regiment
60th Zamosc Infantry Regiment
15th Artillery Brigade

Commanders (Division Chiefs) 
1840-1851: Peter Andreivich Dannenberg  
1854-1856: Nikolai Engelhardt
1896-1900: Vladimir Nikolayevich Filipov
1905: Nikolai Martinovich Ivanov
1909: Dmitry Nikolaevich Bezradetsky
1915-1917: Pyotr Lomnovsky

Chiefs of Staff
1860-1863: Johan Ehrnrooth
1885-1889: Dejan Subotić
1903-1905: Maciej Sulkiewicz
1909: Alexander Pavlovich Khanukov
January-April 1917: Mikhail Drozdovsky
April 1917-March 1918: Evgeny Messner

Commanders of the 1st Brigade
1905: Sergei Petrovich Nekrasov
1909: Stanislav Abakanovich

Commanders of the 2nd Brigade
1905: Mikhail Golembatovsky
1909: Polikarp Kuznetsov

References 

Infantry divisions of the Russian Empire
Military units and formations disestablished in 1918